The 1974 Rothmans 5000  European Championship  was a motor racing series for Formula 5000 cars. The series was organized in the United Kingdom by the British Racing and Sports Car Club, but also incorporated European rounds. It was the sixth in a sequence of annual European Formula 5000 Championships, and the second to be contested as the Rothmans 5000 European Championship. The 1974 championship was won by Bob Evans, driving a Lola T332.

Calendar

The championship was contested over eighteen rounds.

Points system
Championship points were awarded on a 20–15–12–10–8–6–4–3–2–1 basis for the first ten places at each of the first seventeen rounds and on a 40–30–24–20–16–12–8–6–4–2 basis for the first ten places at the final round. Each driver could retain points from fourteen rounds.

Championship standings

References

European Formula 5000 Championship seasons
Rothmans